The 1942 Rice Owls football team was an American football team that represented Rice University as a member of the Southwest Conference (SWC) during the 1942 college football season. In its third season under head coach Jess Neely, the team compiled a 7–2–1 record (4–1–1 against SWC opponents) and outscored opponents by a total of 177 to 74.

Schedule

References

Rice
Rice Owls football seasons
Rice Owls football